Lorrane dos Santos Oliveira (born April 13, 1998) is a Brazilian artistic gymnast. She competed at the 2015 World Artistic Gymnastics Championships and represented Brazil at the 2016 Summer Olympics.

Oliveira took up gymnastics in São Paulo, aged nine. In 2014, she had surgery on both shoulders.

At the 2021 Doha World Cup, Oliveira debuted a new skill, a piked double arabian (dos Santos) half out on floor, which was named after her in the Code of Points.

References 

Living people
1998 births
Brazilian female artistic gymnasts
Gymnasts at the 2015 Pan American Games
Gymnasts at the 2019 Pan American Games
Gymnasts at the 2016 Summer Olympics
Olympic gymnasts of Brazil
Pan American Games bronze medalists for Brazil
Pan American Games medalists in gymnastics
South American Games gold medalists for Brazil
South American Games medalists in gymnastics
Competitors at the 2014 South American Games
Medalists at the 2015 Pan American Games
Medalists at the 2019 Pan American Games
Originators of elements in artistic gymnastics
21st-century Brazilian women